Reo is a genus of pirate spiders first described by Paolo Marcello Brignoli in 1979.  it contains only two species.

References

External links

Araneomorphae genera
Mimetidae